Said Ibraimov (Bulgarian: Саид Ибраимов) (born 14 October 1970) is a Bulgarian former footballer of Turkish descent who is currently employed as a physical conditioning coach at Tobol.

Career

Coming through the youth ranks of Pirin Blagoevgrad, Ibraimov played for Montana, Neftochimic, Litex Lovech and Levski Sofia, winning a Bulgarian Cup with the "bluemen" during the 2002/2003 season. After retiring from the game, he became manager and was part of the coaching team at Litex Lovech during the 2008/2009 season. He was announced as the head coach of Etar 1924 in late December 2011, though a few days later it turned out that no agreement had been reached.

Honours

Assistant Manager
  Litex Lovech
 Bulgarian Cup (1): 2009
  Astana
 Kazakhstan Premier League (4): 2014, 2015, 2016,2017
 Kazakhstan Super Cup (1): 2015
 Kazakhstan Cup (1): 2016

References

1970 births
Living people
People from Blagoevgrad Province
Bulgarian footballers
FC Montana players
Neftochimic Burgas players
PFC Levski Sofia players
PFC Litex Lovech players
First Professional Football League (Bulgaria) players
Association football defenders
Bulgarian people of Turkish descent
Bulgarian expatriate sportspeople in Kazakhstan
Sportspeople from Blagoevgrad Province